The Australasian Performing Right Association Awards of 1992 (generally known as APRA Awards) are a series of awards held in 1992. The APRA Music Awards were presented by Australasian Performing Right Association (APRA) and the Australasian Mechanical Copyright Owners Society (AMCOS).

Awards 

Only winners are noted.

See also 
 Music of Australia

References

External links 

 APRA official website

1992 in Australian music
1992 music awards
APRA Awards